Federal Highway 106 (Carretera Federal 106) is a Federal Highway of Mexico. The highway is a short connector route that links Tres Marias, Morelos in the east to Santa Martha, State of Mexico in the west.

References

106